Johanna Vancura (20 July 1915 – 26 September 1998) was an Austrian sprinter. She competed in the women's 100 metres at the 1936 Summer Olympics.

References

External links
 

1915 births
1998 deaths
Athletes (track and field) at the 1936 Summer Olympics
Austrian female sprinters
Olympic athletes of Austria
Olympic female sprinters